The Parascender I, originally just called the Parascender, is an American single-seat powered parachute that was designed and produced by Parascender Technologies of Kissimmee, Florida and introduced in 1989. Now out of production, when it was available the aircraft was supplied as a kit for amateur construction.

Design and development
It features a  parachute-style wing, single-place accommodation, tricycle landing gear and a single  Rotax 447 engine in pusher configuration. The  Rotax 503 engine was a factory option, as was a  canopy.

The aircraft carriage is built from bolted aluminium tubing, with a unique octagonal dual-tube propeller guard. Inflight steering is accomplished via foot pedals that actuate the canopy brakes, creating roll and yaw. On the ground the aircraft has left hand lever-controlled nosewheel steering. The main landing gear incorporates spring rod suspension.

The manufacturer estimated the construction time from the supplied kit to be 20 hours.

Specifications (Parascender I)

References

Parascender I
1980s United States sport aircraft
1980s United States ultralight aircraft
Single-engined pusher aircraft
Powered parachutes